The 1996 North Dakota Democratic presidential primary was held on February 27, 1996, in North Dakota as one of the Democratic Party's statewide nomination contests ahead of the 1996 presidential election. Incumbent President Bill Clinton did not appear on the ballot allowing for a minor candidate to win the primary.

Results

References

North Dakota
1996 North Dakota elections
North Dakota Democratic caucuses